Nemanja Lakić-Pešić (born 14 January 1991) is Serbian centre back.

Career

Kerala Blasters Football Club
Lakić-Pešić represented Kerala Blasters FC in Indian Super League since 2017-18 season. He also continued his stint with the Blasters in the 2018-19 season also.

Javor Ivanjica
On 9 August 2021, he joined Javor Ivanjica on a one-year contract.

FK Riteriai 
On 1 September 2022 became a member of lithuanian FK Riteriai.

Honours
Donji Srem
Serbian League Vojvodina: 2010–11

References

External sources
 
 Profil on Srbijafudbal  

1991 births
Living people
Footballers from Belgrade
Serbian footballers
Serbian expatriate footballers
Expatriate footballers in Austria
Serbian expatriate sportspeople in Austria
Expatriate footballers in India
Serbian expatriate sportspeople in India
Expatriate footballers in Estonia
Serbian expatriate sportspeople in Estonia
FK Donji Srem players
FK Radnički Niš players
Kapfenberger SV players
Kerala Blasters FC players
FCI Levadia Tallinn players
FK Javor Ivanjica players
Serbian First League players
Serbian SuperLiga players
2. Liga (Austria) players
Indian Super League players
Meistriliiga players
Association football defenders